Okanogan (derived from Syilx'tsn: "rendezvous" or "meeting place") is a city in Okanogan County, Washington, United States. The population was 2,552 at the 2010 census, within the Greater Omak Area. It is the seat of Okanogan County.

History

Okanogan was officially incorporated on October 29, 1907.  

The building had been used as a theater several times and Matsura had played in the Okanogan County Band on stage there. The mural is painted on canvases split between the north and south walls, and a 1915 newspaper clipping found by the Okanogan County Historical Society provided coverage of plans for the murals. Then the Hub Theater, the building was planned to incorporate panoramic scenery murals in tans painted by a local artist. The owners plan to take the murals down for restoration before rehanging them as the centerpiece of a historical exhibit.

Geography
Okanogan is located at  (48.366694, −119.581139).

The town is located along the Okanogan River.

Climate
Okanogan experiences a dry and hot-summer continental climate (Köppen climate classification: Dsa). A weather station is located in nearby Omak.

Demographics

2010 census
As of the census of 2010, there were 2,552 people, 983 households, and 619 families living in the city. The racial makeup of the city was 79.8% White, 0.5% African American, 7.9% Native American, 0.4% Asian, 0.2% Pacific Islander, 6.4% from other races, and 4.8% from two or more races. Hispanic or Latino of any race were 14.1% of the population.

There were 983 households, of which 32.6% had children under the age of 18 living with them, 40.6% were married couples living together, 15.8% had a female householder with no husband present, 6.6% had a male householder with no wife present, and 37.0% were non-families. 30.1% of all households were made up of individuals, and 11.4% had someone living alone who was 65 years of age or older. The average household size was 2.39 and the average family size was 2.91.

The median age in the city was 37.7 years. 24.2% of residents were under the age of 18; 10.1% were between the ages of 18 and 24; 24.3% were from 25 to 44; 26.6% were from 45 to 64; and 14.9% were 65 years of age or older. The gender makeup of the city was 50.7% male and 49.3% female.

2000 census
As of the census of 2000, there were 2,484 people, 909 households, and 599 families living in the city. The population density was 1,354.8 people per square mile (524.1/km2). There were 997 housing units at an average density of 543.8 per square mile (210.4/km2). The racial makeup of the city was 80.60% White, 0.36% African American, 8.17% Native American, 0.40% Asian, 0.08% Pacific Islander, 6.64% from other races, and 3.74% from two or more races. Hispanic or Latino of any race were 10.10% of the population.

There were 909 households, out of which 37.1% had children under the age of 18 living with them, 48.1% were married couples living together, 13.4% had a female householder with no husband present, and 34.0% were non-families. 28.7% of all households were made up of individuals, and 10.9% had someone living alone who was 65 years of age or older. The average household size was 2.49 and the average family size was 3.06.

In the city, the population was spread out, with 27.7% under the age of 18, 8.9% from 18 to 24, 26.4% from 25 to 44, 21.9% from 45 to 64, and 15.1% who were 65 years of age or older. The median age was 37 years. For every 100 females, there were 99.7 males. For every 100 females age 18 and over, there were 94.6 males.

The median income for a household in the city was $26,994, and the median income for a family was $33,947. Males had a median income of $31,143 versus $20,822 for females. The per capita income for the city was $13,849. About 20.2% of families and 24.3% of the population were below the poverty line, including 31.9% of those under age 18 and 16.3% of those age 65 or over.

Sister city

Okanogan has one Sister City, according to the Washington State Lt. Governor's list of Washington Sister Cities:

  Keremeos, British Columbia, Canada

References

External links

 History of Okanogan at HistoryLink

Cities in Washington (state)
Cities in Okanogan County, Washington
County seats in Washington (state)
1907 establishments in Washington (state)
Populated places in Greater Omak
Washington (state) populated places on the Okanogan River
Populated places in the Okanagan Country
Washington placenames of Native American origin